The Ogoni Nine were a group of nine activists from the Ogoni region of Nigeria who opposed the operating practices of the Royal Dutch Shell oil corporation. Their members included outspoken author and playwright Ken Saro-Wiwa, Saturday Dobee, Nordu Eawo, Daniel Gbooko, Paul Levera, Felix Nuate, Baribor Bera, Barinem Kiobel, and John Kpuine (Tripathi, p.189), who were executed by hanging at the 10th of November 1995 by the military dictatorship of General Sani Abacha and buried in Port Harcourt Cemetery.  

The executions provoked international condemnation and led to the increasing treatment of Nigeria as a pariah state until General Abacha's mysterious death in 1998. Saro-Wiwa had previously been a critic of the Royal Dutch Shell oil corporation, and had been imprisoned for a year prior to the executions in November 1995.

At least two witnesses who testified that Saro-Wiwa was involved in the murders of the Ogoni elders later recanted, stating that they had been bribed with money and offers of jobs with Shell to give false testimony – in the presence of Shell's lawyer.

See also
Wiwa family lawsuits against Royal Dutch Shell

References
 
 Salil Tripathi, "Praise the Lord and Buy Insurance", Index on Censorship Volume 34, Number 4, 2005. p.188–192. ISSN 0306-4220.

20th-century executions by Nigeria

Quantified groups of defendants
Executed Nigerian people
People executed by Nigeria by hanging
Nonets
Ken Saro-Wiwa
Burials at the Port Harcourt Cemetery